Porsche Carrera Cup Australia (known commercially as the Porsche Paynter Dixon Carrera Cup Australia) is an Australian motor racing series open to Porsche 911 GT3 Cup cars. First held in 2003, it is administered by Porsche Cars Australia Pty Ltd and is sanctioned by Motorsport Australia (Formerly Confederation of Australian Motor Sport (CAMS)) as a national championship through to 2015 and as a National Series from 2016-2021. Starting in 2022 the category returned back as a national championship. During its history, Carrera Cup has been a leading support category for the Supercars Championship. New Zealand driver Craig Baird has been the most successful driver, winning the series five times.

History
The regulations for the series are based on those used for Porsche Carrera Cup racing series in Europe and the rest of the world, with modifications to the cars strictly controlled to ensure parity between competing vehicles. From 2003 to 2005 the specified model was the Porsche 911 GT3 Cup (Type 996) with the Porsche 911 GT3 Cup (Type 997) used from 2006 and various iterations of the car beyond that, usually in a three-year cycle until the end of 2013. Porsche 911 GT3 Cup (Type 991) was first introduced and used in 2014 until the Porsche 911 GT3 Cup Type 991.II iteration arrived in 2018. Starting in the 2022 season the Porsche 911 GT3 Cup Type 992 is set to be introduced.

Jim Richards was the inaugural champion, fresh from having taken Porsche 996s to three consecutive Australian Nations Cup Championships. The series quickly proved its worthy as a ladder category for emerging young drivers with Alex Davison and Fabian Coulthard winning championships while Marcus Marshall, Jonathon Webb and David Reynolds were also early graduates. The series was also responsible for the creation of a number of professional motor racing teams, including Paul Cruikshank Racing and VIP Petfoods Racing while also giving teams like Sonic Motor Racing Services, Tekno Autosports and International Motorsport opportunities to expand.

Demise
In the lead up to the 2009 season the series organisers were forced to cancel the series, citing a lack of competitors. Those competitors left with 997 GT3 Cup Cars found themselves without a series to race in as the cars were neither able to compete in the Australian GT Championship, to which they were eligible but were prevented by CAMS with the intention of preventing the collapse that ultimately occurred or the Porsche GT3 Cup Challenge Australia as models newer than 996s were not eligible for points. As the situation evolved permission was gained for the Porsches to enter the GT series in strictly limited numbers and likewise 997s were allowed to compete in the GT3 Challenge but to compete to their own pointscore rather than take points away from the 996 and 993s that made up the bulk of the series competitors.

Revival
Porsche Cars Australia announced the series would return for the 2011 season featuring the 2011 specification version of the Type 997 GT3 Cup. Since the series revival Craig Baird, already a two-time champion, dominated again, winning a further three championships. The following seven seasons saw seven new champions, with Baird remaining the only multiple champion as of 2021. Since 2013, an annual two-driver pro-am event has been included in the series, with several guest appearances from Supercars drivers.

In 2015 the Confederation of Australian Motor Sport announced that Carrera Cup would be downgraded from national championship to national series status from 2016.

In 2016 and 2018, a joint round between the series and Porsche Carrera Cup Asia was held at Sydney Motorsport Park. The event featured individual races for each series before two combined races, one for both the Pro and Challenge classes. Both combined races were won by Australian entrants. In 2017, the Australian series travelled to Asia to contest a similar joint round at Sepang International Circuit in Malaysia. The series also introduced an Endurance Cup in 2017, with the first round alongside the Supercars Sandown 500.

In the 2020 season of Porsche Carrera Cup Australia. It would be cancelled after Race 1 of Round 2 during the 2020 Australian Formula 1 Grand Prix weekend in Albert Park Melbourne due to the COVID-19 pandemic. There here by no champion would be crowned for the season.

In the 2022 season. Motorsport Australia (Formerly Confederation of Australian Motor Sport (CAMS)) has announced that Porsche Carrera Cup Australia would regain its status as a national championship.

Champions

Multiple champions

References

External links
 Porsche Paynter Dixon Carrera Cup Australia

 
2003 establishments in Australia
Sports leagues established in 2003